Waldemar Milewicz (August 20, 1956, Dobre Miasto, Poland – May 7, 2004, Latifiya, Iraq) was a Polish journalist and war correspondent.

Life and career
Milewicz obtained a degree in psychology. In 1981, he began working at the public Polish Television (TVP) and in 1991, he began working for the news division. Producing television reports and documentaries, he travelled around the world to many areas of armed conflict, including Abkhazia, Bosnia, Cambodia, Chechnya, Ethiopia, Kosovo, Somalia and Rwanda. In particular, his documentary series Dziwny jest ten świat ("This is a Strange World") made Milewicz one of the best-known reporters in Poland. In 2003, he covered the Iraq War, staying at the Polish military base. Because of poor health, Milewicz had been planning to end his career as a war correspondent after the mission to Iraq. He was killed in a drive-by shooting in Iraq by members of extremist group Jama'at al-Tawhid wal-Jihad.

Death
The Polish TV crew's car was returning to the Polish base camp at Najaf from an interview with insurgents in Baghdad on May 7, 2004. Travelling in a clearly marked press vehicle, they were followed by a group of armed men in another car. Milewicz was hit first and died instantly. Another member of the crew, Mounir Bouamrane, an Algerian-Polish editor and translator who had been working for TVP for about 15 years, was killed in a second volley of gunfire when he left the vehicle. The crew's cameraman, Jerzy Ernst, was wounded in the arm by the second volley of gunfire while in the car, trying to remove Milewicz's body. Their Iraqi driver and guide Assir Kamel al Kazzaz escaped the attack unharmed.

Arrests
In 2006, Polish military intelligence detained three men, following a tip from a rival Shia militia in the Baghdad area. The alleged killers of the Polish journalists were Kifah Hamid Asman, Alim Hussein, and their cell's leader Salah Khabbas, a former Baath Party member who was later associated with al-Qaeda in Iraq. During his arrest, Khabbas offered a $100,000 bribe in exchange for his release. A suspect said that Iraqi Police officers, who had inspected the victims' car as they were leaving Baghdad, informed them of "important people" heading their direction. The detainees also confessed to several other attacks, including roadside bombings and kidnappings for ransom. They however later "vanished" after they were handed-over to the American and Iraqi forces.

Mistaken identity 
On January 11, 2012, the newspaper "Rzeczpospolita" proposed a theory based on WSI archives discovered during verification. The theory stated that Waldemar Milewicz was killed because he shared a name with another Waldemar Milewicz, who was a member of  along with Romuald Szeremietiew and Bronislaw Komorowski, and then a board member of Cenzin, an arms trading company. His presence likely became known when he showed his passport upon arriving at the airport. The film crew members accompanying him were thought to be camouflage, and his murderers most likely had no photo with which to verify his identity. Waldemar Milewicz often traveled to dangerous regions to report, wearing no protection while performing his job in order to facilitate communication while interviewing.

Honours
Milewicz received many awards and prizes for his work, among them the SAIS-Ciba Prize for Excellence in Journalism by Johns Hopkins University in Baltimore in 1995 (for his work in Chechnya), the Polish Grand Press Journalist of the Year Award in 2001, as well as several state awards, including two Order of Polonia Restituta medals (Knight's Cross in 2002 and Officer's Cross posthumously).
The urn with his ashes was rested in the Military Cemetery in Warsaw.

He was a fan of an English synthpop band Depeche Mode. According to his last will, their song I Feel You was played during his memorial service.

References

External links
 Memorial website 

1956 births
2004 deaths
People from Dobre Miasto
Burials at Powązki Military Cemetery
Assassinated Polish journalists
Journalists killed while covering the Iraq War
Polish television journalists
Polish war correspondents
Officers of the Order of Polonia Restituta